Astygisa vexillaria is a moth of the family Geometridae first described by Achille Guenée in 1858. It is found in Sri Lanka, the Indian subregion and Sundaland.

The ground color is brownish with some rusty colored tints. Discal spot in hindwings obscure at most a minute pale dot. Host plants of the caterpillar include Ziziphus mauritiana, and Hovenia dulcis.

References

Moths of Asia
Moths described in 1893